Guellayhuasin (possibly from Quechua q'illay iron, wasi house) is an archaeological site in Peru.

See also 
 Kunturmarka
 Markapukyu
 Qaqapatan

References

Archaeological sites in Pasco Region
Archaeological sites in Peru
Tombs in Peru